Shehawken Creek is a stream located in Wayne County, Pennsylvania, near the town of Starlight. It is also known as Chehocton Creek. It is a tributary of the West Branch Delaware River, into which it flows shortly before the West Branch unites with the East Branch to form the Delaware River.

References 

Rivers of Wayne County, Pennsylvania